Baba Fasiuddin is an Indian politician who was the First  Deputy Mayor of Greater Hyderabad Municipal Corporation after formation of Telangana (GHMC) from 2014 to 4 December 2020. As only the only nominee, he was elected unanimously. He won as Borabanda's representative. Baba Fasiuddin has become the first deputy mayor of Hyderabad after the formation of Telangana.[3]

 
A graduate in commerce, Mr. Fasiuddin played a key role in the Telangana movement as well as in the student and youth wings of the Telangana Rashtra Samithi. He is an associate of Chief Minister K. Chandrashekar Rao.

His family is from Kolcharam Mandal in Medak District. He is presently the president of the TRS Student wing of Greater Hyderabad unit. Fasiuddin's father is a retired Government employee. His mother was an employee at Osmania Hospital. Mr. Fasiuddin is married and has 1 son and a daughter.

References

Living people
1984 births
Place of birth missing (living people)
Politicians from Hyderabad, India
Telangana politicians
Telangana Rashtra Samithi politicians